Avenue or Avenues may refer to:

Roads
 Avenue (landscape), traditionally a straight path or road with a line of trees, in the shifted sense a tree line itself, or some of boulevards (also without trees)
 Avenue Road, Bangalore
 Avenue Road, London
 Avenue Road, Toronto

Other uses
 Avenue (archaeology), a specialist term in archaeology referring to lines of stones
 Avenue (band), X Factor UK contestants
 Avenues (band), American pop punk band
 Avenue (magazine), a former Dutch magazine
 "Avenue" (song), a 1992 single by British pop group Saint Etienne
 Avenue (store), a clothing store
 The Avenue, a Rugby Union stadium in Sunbury-on-Thames, England
 L'Avenue, a proposed skyscraper in Montreal, Quebec, Canada
 Avenue, a GIS scripting language for ArcView 3.x
 Avenues Television, television channel in Nepal
 "The Avenue", B-side of the 1984 Orchestral Manoeuvres in the Dark single "Locomotion"
 Avenues: The World School, school in New York City

See also
 Avinu (disambiguation)
 The Avenues (disambiguation)
 AVE (disambiguation)